Ballad & Pop Hits – The Complete Video Collection is the fourth music video compilation by Swedish pop music duo Roxette, released on 17 November 2003 on DVD by Roxette Recordings and EMI. It features all of the music videos the duo recorded from 1987 to 2003 on one DVD, split into Ballad Hits and Pop Hits. It is a companion piece to the similarly-titled greatest hits compilation albums The Ballad Hits (2002) and The Pop Hits (2003).

Track listing
All songs written by Per Gessle, except "Listen to Your Heart", "Spending My Time", "Queen of Rain", "(Do You Get) Excited?" and "She Doesn't Live Here Anymore" by Gessle and Mats Persson; "You Don't Understand Me" by Gessle and Desmond Child; "Un Día Sin Ti" by Gessle, Persson and Luis Gómez Escolar. All songs produced by Clarence Öfwerman, except "A Thing About You" and "Opportunity Nox" by Gessle and Öfwerman; "Wish I Could Fly", "Anyone", "Salvation", "Stars" and "The Centre of the Heart" by Marie Fredriksson, Gessle, Michael Ilbert and Öfwerman; "Milk and Toast and Honey" and "Real Sugar" by Fredriksson, Gessle and Öfwerman; "She Doesn't Live Here Anymore" by Gessle and Ilbert.

Certifications

References

Roxette video albums
2003 video albums
Music video compilation albums
2003 compilation albums